Juan Carlos Eguren Neuenschwander (born 1 April 1965, in Arequipa) is a Peruvian politician (PPC) and a former Congressman representing the Arequipa region for two terms between 2006 and 2016.

Career 
Eguren holds a bachelor's degree in law. Before he entered Congress, he worked as commercial manager for Tecnología e Importación S.A., a major bottling company. In his Christian People's Party, he acted as doctrine secretary on the level of Arquipa region from 1989 to 2002.

He founded the University Movement Force and Action for Student Change in 1985. He trained politically and doctrinally at the José Faustino Sánchez Carrión Institute, sponsored by the Konrad Adenauer Foundation and chaired by Ernesto Alayza Grundy.

Political career 
In 1989, he was elected to the provincial council of Arequipa Province for a four-year term. In the 2006 election, was elected to Congress for the  2006–2011 term, representing the Arequipa region under the National Unity list. In the 2011 election, he was reelected on the ticket of the Alliance for the Great Change, for the 2011-2016 term to which the Christian Democrats now belong.  He ran for the presidency of the Christian People’s Party in October 2011, but was defeated by Raúl Castro Stagnaro. In June 2015, he voted against the bill on Abortion in Cases of Rape, holding that pregnancies occur in greater numbers in the family environment, that sexual assault rarely generates pregnancies and that even "a large part of rapists are not even able to ejaculate "because they even" suffer from erectile dysfunction. "3 He argued that therefore the issue should be approached from other perspectives. He is a known conservative. He lost his seat in the 2016 elections, when he ran for re-election under the Popular Alliance which grouped the PPC's old rival, the APRA party, but he was not re-elected.

References

External links 
Official Congressional Website
 resume on the National Electoral Committee's site (JNE)

1965 births
Living people
Members of the Congress of the Republic of Peru
National Unity (Peru) politicians

Christian People's Party (Peru) politicians
People from Arequipa